In number theory, the Dirichlet hyperbola method is a technique to evaluate the sum 

 

It uses the fact that

Uses 

Let  be the number-of-divisors function. Since , the Dirichlet hyperbola method gives us the result

 

Wherer  is the Euler–Mascheroni constant.

See also 
 Divisor summatory function

References 

Number theory